Crassispira flavescens is a species of sea snail, a marine gastropod mollusk in the family Pseudomelatomidae.

Description
The length of the shell attains 18 mm.

Distribution
This marine species occurs off Saint Vincent (Antilles)

References

 Fallon P.J. (2011) Descriptions and illustrations of some new and poorly known turrids (Gastropoda: Turridae) of the tropical northwestern Atlantic. Part 3. Genus Crassispira Swainson, 1840, subgenus Crassiclava McLean, 1971. The Nautilus 125(2): 53-62

External links
 
 

flavescens
Gastropods described in 1846